The Congregation of St. Vanne or Congregation of St. Vanne and St. Hydulphe (French: Congrégation de Saint-Vanne et Saint-Hydulphe), sometimes also known as the Vannists (Vannistes) was a Benedictine reform movement centered in the Duchy of Lorraine. It was formally established in 1604 on the initiative of Dom Didier de La Cour, prior of the Abbey of Saint-Vanne near Verdun, a reformer of the Benedictine Order after the Council of Trent. The Abbey of St. Hydulphe at Moyenmoutier was a secondary centre of the reform.

Description
The response to the attempts to return the Benedictine houses to a more rigorous way of life in accordance with the Rule, combined with serious study and scholarship, was very positive, but Lorraine was not at that time under the French crown. A parallel movement specifically for the Benedictine monasteries in the Kingdom of France, on the same principles as those of the Congregation of St. Vanne, was therefore launched from the Abbey of Saint-Germain-des-Prés in Paris in 1621, and gave rise to the Congregation of St. Maur, which became better known than the Vannists.

The Congregation of St. Vanne continued however in Lorraine in parallel to that of St. Maur until the French Revolution, when both were abolished.

Distinguished Vannist scholars included Antoine Augustin Calmet, Rémy Ceillier, Jean François, Nicolas Tabouillot, Thierry Ruinart and Ambroise Pelletier. The noted Dom Perignon, of champagne fame, was a member of this congregation.

Influence and expansion 
(in order of affiliation)
 Abbey of Saint-Vanne, Verdun, co-founding abbey
 Abbey of Saint-Hydulph, Moyenmoutier, co-founding abbey
 Abbey of Saint-Nabor, Saint-Avold (1607)
 Abbey of the Holy Cross, Bouzonville (1612)
 Abbey of Faverney (1613)
 Abbey of St. Peter, Senones (1618)
 Priory of St. Barbara, near Metz (1633) 
 Monastery of Luxeuil (1634)
 Abbey of St. Peter, Montiéramey (1655-1790)
 Abbey of Sts. Peter and Paul, Pothières (1655)
 Abbey of Munster (1659)
 Priory of Notre Dame of Breuil, Commercy (n/a)
 Abbey of St. Leopold, Nancy (n/a)
 Abbey of Saint Mansuy, Toul (n/a)
 Abbey of St. Maurus, Bleurville (n/a)
 Abbey of Notre Dame, (Mouzon, Ardennes) (n/a)
 Abbey of Novy, Ardennes (n/a)

Notes

Sources 
 Michaux, Gérard Michaux, 1998: Dom Didier de La Cour et la réforme des Bénédictins de Saint-Vanne in: Les Prémontrés et la Lorraine XIIe - XVIIIe siècle, pp. 125–144 (XXIIIe colloque du Centre d'études et de recherches prémontrées, under the direction of Dominique-Marie Dauzet and Martine Plouvier). Paris: Beauchesne.
 Dauphin, Hubert OSB (Quarr Abbey) 1947: L'Abbaye Saint-Vanne de Verdun et la Querelle des Investitures in: Revue Stydi Gregoriani per la Storia di Gregorio VII e Della Reforma Gregoriana, pp. 237–261 Roma: Abbazia di San Paolo di Roma 

Benedictine congregations
History of Catholic monasticism
History of Lorraine
1604 establishments in the Holy Roman Empire